Black Earth is the fourth album by the jazz/ambient band Bohren & der Club of Gore. Black Earth was re-released on the American label Ipecac Recordings in 2004, increasing the band's exposure in the United States. The record has been re-released in 2016 by PIAS Recordings.

Track listing
All songs written by Bohren & der Club of Gore.
 "Midnight Black Earth" – 8:45
 "Crimson Ways" – 6:39
 "Maximum Black" – 7:38
 "Vigilante Crusade" – 7:30
 "Destroying Angels" – 7:10
 "Grave Wisdom" – 6:32
 "Constant Fear" – 6:27
 "Skeletal Remains" – 7:58
 "The Art of Coffins" – 12:04

Personnel
Morten Gass: Piano, Fender Rhodes, Mellotron
Christoph Clöser: Piano, Fender Rhodes, Saxophone
Robin Rodenberg: Bass
Thorsten Benning: Drums, Percussion

Production
Produced & Engineered By Morten Gass
Mixed By Bohren & der Club of Gore

References

2002 albums
Bohren & der Club of Gore albums
Ipecac Recordings albums